Suli Mahalleh (also Romanized as Şūlī Maḩalleh and Sūlī Maḩalleh; also known as Sūlī Maḩalleh-ye Ḩavīq) is a village in Haviq Rural District, Haviq District, Talesh County, Gilan Province, Iran. At the 2006 census, its population was 465, in 98 families.

References 

Populated places in Talesh County